Beautiful Goodbye is the 11th studio album by singer/songwriter and record producer Richard Marx. It was released on July 8, 2014.  It is his first new studio album since his 2008 albums Emotional Remains and Sundown, although a seasonal album Christmas Spirit was issued in 2012. The album was preceded by the singles "Turn Off The Night" in the UK on May 20 and "Whatever We Started" in the US on May 22. The title track was released as a single on September 13, 2014. "Just Go", a bonus track, had been previously released as a single on February 14, 2013.

According to Nielsen SoundScan, this disc had sold a total of 25,165 American copies as of January, 2018.

Track listing
"Whatever We Started" (Marx) - 3:55
"Suddenly" (Marx) - 4:45
"Inside" (Marx) - 5:29
"Beautiful Goodbye" (Marx, Daisy Fuentes) - 4:55
"Forgot To Remember" (Marx, Matt Scannell, Chris Mann) - 3:49
"Turn Off The Night" (Marx, David Hodges, Steven Miller) - 3:28
"Have A Little Faith" (Marx) - 4:43
"Like The World Is Ending" (Marx) - 4:15
"To My Senses" (Marx) - 4:56
"Getaway" (Marx, Walter Afanasieff) - 3:41
"Eyes On Me" (Marx) - 3:04

Bonus tracks
"Just Go" (Marx)
"Moscow Calling" (Marx)

Chart performance

Album credits
 Richard Marx – producer, lead and backing vocals, arrangements, guitars, acoustic guitar, piano, keyboards, programming, bass guitar, string arrangements
 Walter Afanasieff – keyboards, programming, string arrangements
 Michael Jade – keyboards, programming, backing vocals
 Morgan Page – programming
 C.J. Vanston – keyboards, programming, string arrangements
 J. Blynn – guitars
 Bruce Gaitsch – guitars
 Michael Landau – guitars
 Heitor Pereira – guitars
 Matt Scannell – guitars
 Michael Thompson – guitars
 Paul Bushnell – bass guitar
 Herman Matthews – drums
 Lucas Marx – drum programming
 Cliff Colnot – string arrangements
 Jeremy Lubbock – string arrangements
 Steven Miller – string arrangements
 Chris Walden – string arrangements
 Molly DeWolf – backing vocals
David Hodges – backing vocals, string arrangements
 Chip Matthews – mixing
 Matthew Prock – mixing

References 

2014 albums
Richard Marx albums
Albums produced by Richard Marx
Albums produced by Walter Afanasieff
Frontiers Records albums